Inderkilla National Park is a national park in Himachal Pradesh, India established in 2010. The national park is located in the Kullu district and 46.1 kilometers away from the Kullu Manali Airport.

Rare mammals live here, such as brown and black bears, leopards and various mountain deer and goats. Over 250 species of birds have been recorded in the park.

References

2010 establishments in Himachal Pradesh
Protected areas established in 2010
Protected areas of Himachal Pradesh
National parks in Himachal Pradesh